Countess Anne Joanne of Nassau-Siegen (2 March 1594Jul. – December 1636), official titles: Gräfin zu Nassau, Katzenelnbogen, Vianden und Diez, Frau zu Beilstein, was a countess from the House of Nassau-Siegen, a cadet branch of the Ottonian Line of the House of Nassau, and through marriage Lady of Brederode, Vianen, Ameide and Kloetinge.

Biography
Anne Joanne was born at Dillenburg Castle on 2 March 1594Jul. as the ninth child and fourth daughter of Count John VII ‘the Middle’ of Nassau-Siegen and his first wife, Countess Magdalene of Waldeck-Wildungen. Anne Joanne was baptised in Siegen on Sunday 17 MarchJul..

The castle where the marriage took place was the Residenz of Count , the husband of Anne Joanne’s sister Anne Mary. Johan Wolfert brought all his goods in the marriage, while Anne Joanne brought 12,000 guilders, of which the interest was 600 guilders annually, and her own goods and jewellery. As a dower she was granted Haaften Manor and 4000 guilders annually. According to an eyewitness, the marriage contract and the testaments were signed on 19 June and ‘habe dauraufhin die Kopulation stattgefunden und die Hochzeit bis auf Mittwoch, den 23. Juni, gewährt’ (‘thereupon the copulation took place and the wedding was celebrated until Wednesday, 23 June’). After the festivities the young couple travelled by coach to Wesel, whereupon Prince Maurice of Orange’s yacht took them to Vianen. Two of Anne Joanne’s brothers were in the party: William and fourteen-year-old John Maurice. A painting by Cornelis Vroom in the town hall of Vianen shows the arrival of the couple on the River Lek.

On 16 March 1620 their first child was born, a daughter Sofia Theodora. The grandfather, Count John ‘the Middle’, congratulated the parents on the birth of their daughter in his letter from Rheinfels of 4 April 1620, but he himself would have preferred a son.

Great was the joy when the long-awaited son, Walraven, was born on 25 September 1628. Three days after the birth, Johan Wolfert sent the drost of Vianen to the States of Holland with the message that his wife had given birth to ‘een jonge Soon, weesende sijnen eersten Soon, die hy dagte op te trekken om het Land dienst te mogen doen’ (‘a young son, being his first son, whom he had planned to raise to the service of the country’). He asked the States to act as sponsors for the baptism. The States voted a generous baptismal gift of 1800 guilders. However, the boy died a few days later, on 1 October. The grief about this also reached the outside world. Joost van den Vondel, in his poem De Rijnstroom about the River Rhine, which he dedicated to Johan Wolfert, wrote a couple of verses about the longing for a son.

At the baptism of Countess Henriette Amalia of Nassau, the daughter of Prince Frederick Henry of Orange and Countess Amalia of Solms-Braunfels, on 23 November 1628, Anne Joanne was a baptismal witness.

The castle was beautifully furnished and the walls were papered with tapestries and gold wallpaper. The couple received many guests in Vianen, including Prince Frederick Henry and Countess Amalia of Solms-Braunfels, the counts of Nassau and Solms, the viscounts of Dohna and members of the States of Holland, who were received royally. Because Johan Wolfert frequently had to visit The Hague for his duties, he bought a representative building on 3 Lange Vijverberg from Countess Emilia of Nassau in 1626. After Johan Wolfert was appointed governor of the city of ʼs-Hertogenbosch and the Meierij on 27 January 1630, the family moved into the Jesuit college as their official residence. The city magistrate donated costly tapestries for the palace in 1631 and contributed to Anne Joanne’s travel expenses, elegantly wrapped in a fine purse, when she visited the city.

The year 1630 was a difficult one for the couple. Anne Joanne gave birth to stillborn children in March and October. Furthermore Theodora van Haaften, the mother of Johan Wolfert, died in August. In October 1631 Anne Joanne again gave birth to a stillborn child.

Anne Joanne died in The Hague in December 1636. She was buried in the Great Church in Vianen.

Johan Wolfert remarried in The Hague on 11 February 1638 to Countess Louise Christine of Solms-Braunfels (Braunfels, 17 October 1606 – Vianen, 24 March 1669). Louise Christine was a younger sister of Amalia of Solms-Braunfels, wife of Prince Frederick Henry of Orange. Eight children were born from Johan Wolfert’s second marriage. Johan Wolfert died on 3 September 1655 at Petersheim Castle near Maastricht, a property of his relative Ferdinand de Merode. He was interred in the family tomb in the Great Church in Vianen on 25 October.

Portrait of Anne Joanne painted by Van Dyck?

One of the most intriguing questions in the iconography of the Brederodes is whether the court painter Anthony van Dyck contributed to it. Van Dyck visited The Hague in the early summer of 1631, where he painted the portraits of Prince Frederick Henry of Orange, his wife Amalia and their son William. He may also have painted Anne Joanne on the same occasion. Her portrait, which was kept at  until the Second World War and fell victim to the flames there, shows amazing similarities to the portrait that Van Dyck made of Amalia of Solms-Braunfels. Not only are the composition and the clothing identical, but both women have a distinguished regal appearance. Van Dyck was known for his ability to flatter his models without violating their likeness. Johan Wolfert honoured this portrait of his first wife. In 1646, ten years after her death, it was still hanging in his ‘cantoir’ at Batestein Castle.

The knee-length portrait showed Anne Joanne sitting. She wore a dark dress with a raised waist and wide sleeves, a lace composite collar, a pearl necklace on a brocade bow for the chest, and a fan in her right hand. In the portrait, she has frizzy hair with thin fringes. The portrait hung at Schlobitten Castle in the Garden Hall in the 2nd row on the far right. It was destroyed in 1945.

Issue
From the marriage of Anne Joanne and Johan Wolfert the following children were born:
 Sofia Theodora (Vianen, 16 March 1620 – Halberstadt, 23 September 1678), married in ʼs-Hertogenbosch in April 1644 to Viscount Christian Albrecht of Dohna (Küstrin, 15 November 1621 – Gartz, 14 December 1677).
 Juliana (ca. 1622 – 10 July 1678).
 Florentina (Vianen, 7 January 1624 – Frankfurt, 13 February 1698), married in ʼs-Hertogenbosch on 9 March 1645 to Count Maurice of Solms-Hungen (21 November 1622 – 30 November 1678).
 Trajectina Anna (13 April 1626 – 13 februari 1672), married in 1670 to Count George Herman Reinhard of Wied-Runkel (9 July 1640 – 7 June 1690).
 Walraven (Vianen, 25 September 1628 – 1 October 1628).
 Amalia Margaretha (? – 14 August 1663 (1665?)), married:
 in 1645 to Albrecht Heinrich Slawata von Chlum und Koschumberg (? – 1661).
 on 28 December 1662 to Count  (Regensburg, 13 March 1630 – Vienna, 25 December 1695).
 stillborn daughter (ʼs-Hertogenbosch, 30 October 1630).
 stillborn daughter (ʼs-Hertogenbosch, October 1631).
From the marriage also two sons and two daughters were born, who died unbaptised.

Ancestors

Notes

References

Sources
 
 
 
 
 
 
 
  (1999). "Genealogische tabellen". In:  e.a. (red.), Johan Wolfert van Brederode 1599-1655. Een Hollands edelman tussen Nassau en Oranje (in Dutch). Vianen: Historische Vereniging Het Land van Brederode/Zutphen: Uitgeversmaatschappij Walburg Pers. p. 133–135. .
 
 
 
 
 ;  (1999). "Johan Wolfert van Brederode 1599–1655 – ʻIn Opbloey neergetoghenʼ". In:  e.a. (red.), Johan Wolfert van Brederode 1599–1655. Een Hollands edelman tussen Nassau en Oranje (in Dutch). Vianen: Historische Vereniging Het Land van Brederode/Zutphen: Uitgeversmaatschappij Walburg Pers. p. 9–46. .
 
 
  (1937). "Brederode, Joan Wolfert van". In:  en  (redactie), Nieuw Nederlandsch Biografisch Woordenboek (in Dutch). Vol. Tiende deel. Leiden: A.W. Sijthoff. p. 125–126.
  (1979). "Genealogische gegevens". In:  (red.), Nassau en Oranje in de Nederlandse geschiedenis (in Dutch). Alphen aan den Rijn: A.W. Sijthoff. p. 40–44, 224–228. .
 , "Familiereünie in Vianen. Portretten van Johan Wolfert van Brederode en zijn gezin herenigd". In:  e.a. (red.), Johan Wolfert van Brederode 1599–1655. Een Hollands edelman tussen Nassau en Oranje (in Dutch). Vianen: Historische Vereniging Het Land van Brederode/Zutphen: Uitgeversmaatschappij Walburg Pers. p. 9–46. .
 
  (1882). Het vorstenhuis Oranje-Nassau. Van de vroegste tijden tot heden (in Dutch). Leiden: A.W. Sijthoff/Utrecht: J.L. Beijers.
 , "De kleding van de Nederlandse adel in de 17de eeuw en de portretten van de Brederodes". In:  e.a. (red.), Johan Wolfert van Brederode 1599–1655. Een Hollands edelman tussen Nassau en Oranje (in Dutch). Vianen: Historische Vereniging Het Land van Brederode/Zutphen: Uitgeversmaatschappij Walburg Pers. p. 9–46. .

External links

 Huis Brederode (in Dutch).
 Nassau. In: Medieval Lands. A prosopography of medieval European noble and royal families, compiled by Charles Cawley.
 Nassau Part 5. In: An Online Gotha, by Paul Theroff.

|-

1594 births
1636 deaths
Anne Joanne of Nassau-Siegen
Dutch Calvinist and Reformed Christians
German Calvinist and Reformed Christians
Anne Joanne of Nassau-Siegen
People from Dillenburg
∞|Anne Joanne of Nassau-Siegen
16th-century German women
17th-century Dutch women
17th-century German women